Harry Hargreaves may refer to:

Harry Hargreaves (cartoonist)
Harry Hargreaves (footballer)

See also
Henry Hargreaves (disambiguation)